Răzvan Lucescu (born 17 February 1969) is a Romanian professional football manager and former player, who is the current manager of Greek Super League club PAOK.

As a player, he operated as a  goalkeeper and spent most years of his career at Sportul Studențesc during three stints. Lucescu also represented Național București, Brașov, Rapid București and  FCM Bacău in his country, as well as Crema Calcio abroad. He won his only national title with Rapid in the 2002–03 campaign.

He returned to Brașov in 2004 for his first role as a manager, before moving to Rapid where he guided the team to the Cupa României in the 2005–06 and 2006–07 seasons. Between 2009 and 2011, Lucescu was in charge of the Romania national team. His other managerial honours include six domestic trophies with El Jaish, PAOK and  Al Hilal combined. With the latter side, he also won the AFC Champions League in 2019.

Playing career
Born in Bucharest, Lucescu made 240 appearances in the Divizia A for Sportul Studențesc, Național București, Brașov, Rapid București and FCM Bacău.

Managerial career

Brașov
He began his coaching career with FC Brașov in the 2003–04 season spanning 15 matches in the first league.

Rapid București
In June 2004, he was named coach of Rapid București. In his first season, he qualified for the UEFA Cup, finishing third in the domestic league.

In the 2005–06 season, he had a dramatic start of the season, being dismissed for one night, before the owner of the club, George Copos, decided to take him back. Lucescu and his side managed to defeat teams such as Feyenoord Rotterdam, Shakhtar Donetsk (his father's team), Hertha Berlin and Hamburger SV, reaching to the quarter-finals of the UEFA Cup. Rapid was taken out by city rivals Steaua Bucharest after two draws. In the league, he finished as runners-up, after being sixth at the half of the season.

The 2006–07 season was not as good. Rapid got eliminated from the UEFA Cup group stages after 4 draws, finishing fourth.
However, in 2007 Lucescu decided not to continue with Rapid, after a fallout with some of the supporters and several disagreements with the club owner. He opted to return to Braşov.

Răzvan won the Romanian Cup with Rapid in 2006 and 2007, both leading Rapid into the UEFA Cup.

Return to Brașov
Lucescu decided to start all over and, instead of accepting to manage bigger clubs from abroad, he decided to coach FC Brașov, who relegated two years before and finished 10th in the last season of the second division. He didn't disappoint and won promotion from the first place. Bringing Braşov back in the first league.

Romania national team

On 29 April 2009, he was appointed head coach and general manager of Romania, leaving Braşov after a ninth-place finish in the first division and replacing Victor Piţurcă in this position. After two years in control he gave up the national team, following the 3–0 victory over Bosnia and Herzegovina, leaving it with chances of qualifying to the UEFA Euro 2012.

Return to Rapid București
In June 2011, Lucescu returned to Rapid București for a second spell as coach. Lucescu's Rapid side defeated Polish champions Śląsk Wrocław 4–2 on aggregate in the play-off round to qualify for the UEFA Europa League group stage. The club finished fourth in Liga I and reached the finals of the 2011–12 Romanian Cup.

El Jaish
On 31 May 2012, he was appointed at the helm of Qatari side El Jaish on a two-year deal. In his first season in charge Lucescu won the 2012–13 Qatari Stars Cup and led his side into the knockout stages of the AFC Champions League. His contract with El Jaish was terminated in January 2014 and he was replaced by coach Nabil Maâloul who led the club to the runner-up spot in the Qatar Stars League.

Petrolul Ploiești
In March 2014, he was named the head coach of Liga I side Petrolul Ploiești replacing Cosmin Contra. He was sacked six months later, Petrolul finished third in the domestic league and were knocked out in the semi-finals by Astra Giurgiu in the Romanian Cup and also eliminated in the play-offs of the Europa League.

Xanthi
On 24 September 2014, Lucescu signed a one-year contract with Greek Super League club Skoda Xanthi. He guided them to their first Greek Cup final in their history. Lucescu went on to extend his contract with the Akrites for a further two seasons.

PAOK
On 11 August 2017, Lucescu would return to the benches of Superleague Greece as he signed a three-year contract with PAOK. His tenure at the club started against Ostersund for the play-off round of 2017–18 UEFA Europa League. PAOK went to win the first leg in Thessaloniki, 3–1, but a 0–2 defeat in Sweden in the second leg eliminated them from the competition, as they failed to reach the Europa League group stages for the first time in 5 years. At the home front, PAOK had a turbulent season, as they found themselves fighting for the league title with real chances. However, the derbies came to disastrous outcomes, with PAOK losing to Olympiacos due to an awarded 3–0 win, as the match was suspended for fan behavior. Against rivals AEK Athens, the president of the team, Ivan Savvidis, stormed onto the pitch with a pistol in his holster after a late PAOK goal was overturned after protests from AEK, causing the league to be suspended. PAOK was later punished with a reduction of 3 points and the awarding of the game to AEK by 0–3. The awarded derbies, as well as the court deduction, played a big role in PAOK losing the league title to AEK, as they finished the championship 2nd, 6 points behind their double-headed eagle rivals. Afterwards, PAOK won the Greek Cup after defeating AEK 2–0 in the Cup final in OAKA, Athens, which was viewed as a consolation prize for the lost championship.

In the 2018–19 season, PAOK begin their European adventure in the Second Qualifying Round of the UEFA Champions League, eliminating Basel and Spartak Moscow, before losing in the play-offs against Benfica and dropping to the UEFA Europa League group stages. PAOK finished fourth in a group with Chelsea, BATE Borisov and Videoton, only winning 4–1 against BATE in Barysaw and losing all the other matches.

Despite the early European exit, the team enjoyed a great domestic season. On 21 April 2019, PAOK won their third league title and their first in 34 years after beating Levadiakos at home with 5–0. Lucescu led his side to league triumph without a single defeat, a milestone last reached by Panathinaikos 65 years before, and finished the season with a record-breaking 80 points.

Al-Hilal
On 28 June 2019, Lucescu parted ways with PAOK after receiving an offer to manage Saudi Arabian club Al-Hilal. The club reportedly paid PAOK the manager's €2M release clause. Răzvan had rejected the proposal from the specific team in May, however he changed his mind after a strong disagreement with the president of PAOK Ivan Savvidis and his son Giorgos Savvidis who had different plans for the team from them, that Lucescu had. As a result, he judged that he had no reason to stay in the team if his own plans for the team were not accepted, and so he left taking advantage of the fact that Al Hilal again proposed to him. He brought the club to its third AFC Champions League-era title and first continental title in 17 years, after a 3–0 win on aggregate over Urawa Red Diamonds in the 2019 AFC Champions League Final. He was dismissed after a 1–0 defeat against Damac in February 2021.

Return to PAOK
After two years in Saudi Arabia, Lucescu returned to PAOK for a second term, signing a three-year contract with a salary of €1.7 million without including the bonuses and became the highest paid coach in the history of PAOK. In the Super League, PAOK finished 2nd 19 points behind the champion Olympiacos, which, however, eliminated in the semifinals of the Greek Cup to find PAOK for the 5th time in 6 years in a cup final where it suffered a 1-0 defeat by Panathinaikos in the final in which there were many protests for refereeing against PAOK. In the Europa Conference League he managed to reach the quarterfinals of the tournament where he was eliminated by Marseille where there were also protests against refereeing against PAOK.

Personal life
Lucescu's father, Mircea, also coached the Romania national team and Rapid București, and is one of the most decorated managers of all time.

Managerial statistics

Honours

Player
Național București
Cupa României runner-up: 1996–97

Rapid București
Liga I: 2002–03

Manager
Rapid București
Cupa României: 2005–06, 2006–07, runner-up: 2011–12

Brașov
Liga II: 2007–08

El Jaish
Qatari Stars Cup: 2012–13

Xanthi
Greek Cup runner-up: 2014–15

PAOK
Super League Greece: 2018–19 runner-up: 2017–18, 2021–22
Greek Cup: 2017–18, 2018–19 runner-up: 2021–22

Al-Hilal
AFC Champions League: 2019
Saudi Professional League: 2019–20
Saudi King Cup: 2019–20

Individual
Gazeta Sporturilor Romania Coach of the Year: 2018, 2019, 2020 (joint with Cosmin Olăroiu)
Gazeta Sporturilor Romania Coach of the Month: March 2022
Super League Greece Manager of the Season:  2018–19
Saudi Professional League Manager of the Month: September 2019, January 2020, February 2020, November 2020
IFFHS AFC Man Coach of the Year: 2020

References

External links

1969 births
Living people
Footballers from Bucharest
Association football goalkeepers
Romanian footballers
Romania under-21 international footballers
FC Sportul Studențesc București players
FC Progresul București players
FC Brașov (1936) players
FC Rapid București players
FCM Bacău players
Liga I players
Romanian football managers
FC Brașov (1936) managers
FC Rapid București managers
Romania national football team managers
El Jaish SC managers
FC Petrolul Ploiești managers
Romanian expatriate football managers
Expatriate football managers in Qatar
Expatriate football managers in Greece
Expatriate football managers in Saudi Arabia
Xanthi F.C. managers
PAOK FC managers
Super League Greece managers
Al Hilal SFC managers
Romanian expatriate sportspeople in Qatar
Romanian expatriate sportspeople in Greece
Romanian expatriate sportspeople in Saudi Arabia
Saudi Professional League managers